Binti: Home is a 2017 science fiction novella written by Nnedi Okorafor and published by Tor.com. Binti: Home is the sequel to Okorafor's Binti from 2015, and is followed by Binti: The Night Masquerade, published in 2018.

Plot 
Binti, a young Himba woman from Earth, returns home to face her family and elders after her first year at the off-world Oomza University. Her reconciliation is complicated by her family's hostility, her physical transformation and the presence of her Meduse friend, Okwu. Travelling into the desert, she meets her father's disavowed relatives and under their guidance confronts intra-tribal prejudice and undergoes her second profound physical transformation. Meanwhile, the war between the Meduse and the Khoush erupts, with Binti's family caught in the middle.

Reception
Amal El-Mohtar, reviewing the novella for NPR, and Catherine Grant who reviewed it for the New York Journal of Books, both praised Okorafor's writing and her flouting of genre boundaries, but found the cliffhanger ending somewhat unsatisfying.

Binti: Home was a finalist for both the Hugo Award for Best Novella and the Locus Award for Best Novella in 2018.

Series 
 Binti – published in 2015
 1.5.  "Binti: Sacred Fire" – published in 2019 as a new short story in the collection Binti: The Complete Trilogy; serves as an interlude between Binti and Home
 Binti: Home – published in 2017
 Binti: The Night Masquerade – published in 2018

References

External links
 

Nigerian science fiction novels
2017 American novels
Africanfuturist novels
American science fiction novels
English-language novels
Tor Books books
Works by Nnedi Okorafor
Speculative fiction novellas
2017 Nigerian novels